John Longden (11 November 1900 – 26 May 1971) was an English film actor. He appeared in more than 80 films between 1926 and 1964, including five films directed by Alfred Hitchcock.

Biography
Longden was born in the West Indies, the son of a Methodist missionary, and was educated at Kingswood School, Bath, Somerset. Originally intending to be a mining engineer, he worked for two years in a coal mine in Yorkshire, where he started acting in amateur theatrical companies. An introduction to Seymour Hicks saw him start acting on the legitimate stage, beginning with a walk-on part in Old Bill, MP. He played in My Old Dutch with Albert Chevalier, then spent time with the Liverpool and Birmingham repertory theatres. He also appeared in The Farmer's Wife, produced by Barry Jackson at the Court Theatre in London for two years.

About this time Longden began to appear in silent films. He signed a contract with Gaumont British Pictures to write and act, earning a notable success with Alfred Hitchcock's Blackmail (1929).

Australian interlude
Longden went out to Australia in 1933 to perform in several plays. While there he appeared in the film The Silence of Dean Maitland (1934) for Cinesound Productions.

The performance was so well received Longden made two more films for the same company, Thoroughbred (1936) and It Isn't Done (1937).

In 1934 it was announced that he was going to play the lead in an adaptation of Robbery Under Arms, but this film was never made. The same year Longden also announced he was going to act in and direct an Australian film called Highway Romance, about an English man and Australian girl travelling from Sydney to Brisbane. A company called Highway Productions was formed with Frederick Ward and a capital of £10,000 but no film resulted.

Later career
Longden returned to Britain where he continued to work steadily in theatre and film (including An Honourable Murder (1960), an adaptation of Shakespeare's "Julius Caesar", in which he played tycoon 'Julian Caesar'). He appeared on several episodes of season one of The Adventures of Robin Hood playing various characters, and returned for one episode in season three. He died in London, 26 May 1971, aged 70.

Selected filmography

 The Ball of Fortune (1926) - Daltry
 The House of Marney (1927) - Richard
 The Glad Eye (1927) - Floquet
 The Flight Commander (1927) - Ivan
 The Arcadians (1927) - Jack Meadows
 Quinneys (1927) - Joseph Quinney
 Mademoiselle Parley Voo (1928) - Le Beau - Illusionist
 Palais de danse (1928) - No. 1
 What Money Can Buy (1928) - Ralph Tresham
 You Know What Sailors Are (1928) - Minor Role
 The Flying Squad (1929) - Inspector John Bradley
 Piccadilly (1929) - Man from China (uncredited)
 Blackmail (1929) - Detective Frank Webber
 Atlantic (1929) - Lanchester
 The Last Post (1929) - David / Martin
 Elstree Calling (1930)
 The Flame of Love (1930) - Lieutenant Boris Boriskoff
 Juno and the Paycock (1930) - Charles Bentham
 Two Worlds (1930) - Lt. Stanislaus von Zaminsky (British Version)
 Children of Chance (1930) - Jeffrey
 The Skin Game (1931) - Charles Hornblower
 Two Crowded Hours (1931, Short) - Harry Fielding
 The Ringer (1931) - Inspector Wembury
 Hindle Wakes (1931) - Boyfriend (uncredited)
 Murder on the Second Floor (1932) - Warder Jackson
 The Wickham Mystery (1932) - Harry Crawford
 A Lucky Sweep (1932) - Bill Higgins
 Rynox (1932) - Tony Benedik
 Born Lucky (1933) - Frank Dale
 The Silence of Dean Maitland (1934) - Dean Cyril Maitland
 Thoroughbred (1936) - Bill Peel
 It Isn't Done (1937) - Peter Ashton
 French Leave (1937) - Lt. Glennister
 Jennifer Hale (1937) - Police Inspector Merton
 Young and Innocent (1937) - Det. Insp. Kent
 Little Miss Somebody (1937) - Jim Trevor
 Dial 999 (1938) - Bill Waring
 The Gaunt Stranger (1938) - Inspector Bliss
 Bad Boy (1938) - Inspector Thompson
 Q Planes (1939) - Peters
 Jamaica Inn (1939) - Captain Johnson (uncredited)
 Goodbye, Mr. Chips (1939) - Raven (uncredited)
 The Lion Has Wings (1939)
 Contraband (1940) - Passport Officer
 Tower of Terror (1941) - Commandant
 Old Mother Riley's Circus (1941) - Bill
 The Common Touch (1941) - Stuart Gordon
 This Was Paris (1942) - French Officer (uncredited)
 One of Our Aircraft Is Missing (1942) - Ground Officer (uncredited)
 Unpublished Story (1942) - Metcalf (uncredited)
 Rose of Tralee (1942) - Paddy O'Brien
 The Silver Fleet (1943) - Jost Meertens
 Yellow Canary (1943) - Officer (uncredited)
 Death by Design (1943) - Inspector Slade
 A Matter of Life and Death (1946) - Narrator (voice, uncredited)
 Dusty Bates (1947) - Tod Jenkins
 The Ghosts of Berkeley Square (1947) - Mortimer Digby
 Anna Karenina (1948) - Gen. Serpuhousky
 The Last Load (1948) - Mr. Potter
 Bonnie Prince Charlie (1948) - Col. O'Sullivan
 Trapped by the Terror (1949) - Pierre
 Feature Story (1949)
 The Lady Craved Excitement (1950) - Inspector James
 The Fighting Pimpernel (1950) - The Abbot
 The Man Who Disappeared - Sherlock Holmes
 Pool of London (1951) - Det. Insp. Williams
 The Dark Light (1951) - Stephen
 The Magic Box (1951) - Speaker in Connaught Rooms
 The Black Widow (1951) - Mr. Kemp
 The Wallet (1952) - Man With Pipe
 Dangerous Cargo (1954) - Worthington
 Meet Mr. Callaghan (1954) - Jeremy Meraulton
 The Ship That Died of Shame (1955) - The Detective
 Alias John Preston (1955) - Richard Sandford
 Count of Twelve (1955) - Simon Graves (episode "The Count of Twelve")
 Raiders of the River (1956) - Professor Dykes
 Quatermass 2 (1957) - Lomax
 Three Sundays to Live (1957) - Warder
 Innocent Sinners (1958) - Admiral (uncredited)
 Woman's Temptation (1959) - Inspector Syms
 An Honourable Murder (1960) - Julian Caesar
 So Evil, So Young (1961) - Turner
 Lancelot and Guinevere (1963) - King Leodogran (uncredited)
 The Man Who Finally Died (1963) - Munch (uncredited)
 Frozen Alive (1964) - Prof. Hubbard

References

External links

1900 births
1971 deaths
English male film actors
English male silent film actors
English emigrants to Australia
20th-century English male actors